Seicross, known as  in Japan, is a shooter arcade game developed and released by Nichibutsu in Japan and North America. This port was also published in North America for the Nintendo Entertainment System by FCI.

Overview 

During the game play of Seicross, the player rides a gliding motorcycle-like vehicle, bumping other riders, collecting power modules and collecting blue people who are stranded.  A second area removes the riders and adds rough terrain, while the final leg features a battle with one or more Dinosaur Tanks, which launch their heads when destroyed.  The sequence repeats infinitely, getting progressively difficult and changing backgrounds.

Reception
Gene Lewin of Play Meter rated the arcade game 8 out of 10, stating it "is challenging as well as fun to play."

Notes

References

External links
Seicross at arcade-history
Sector Zone at arcade-history

1984 video games
Nihon Bussan games
Nintendo Entertainment System games
Racing video games
Arcade video games
Nintendo Switch games
PlayStation 4 games
Video games developed in Japan
Virtual Console games
Virtual Console games for Wii U
Single-player video games

Hamster Corporation games
Hamster Corporation franchises